Michael Lejan (born 2 May 1983) is a German-born Belgian former professional football left back.

Early years
Michael Lejan was born in Soest, Germany as son of a member of the Belgian army in Soest in the German state of North Rhine-Westphalia. He lived in Werl for nine years and moved to Siegen, where he lived for two years before moving to Cologne, where his father was transferred.

Career

References

External links
 
 

1983 births
Living people
Association football midfielders
Belgian footballers
1. FC Köln players
1. FC Köln II players
Wuppertaler SV players
VfL Osnabrück players
SC Fortuna Köln players
Alemannia Aachen players
Bundesliga players
2. Bundesliga players
3. Liga players
Regionalliga players
People from Soest, Germany
Sportspeople from Arnsberg (region)